Uwe Weidemann (born 14 June 1963) is an East German former professional  footballer who played as an attacking midfielder. He later became a coach, last managing VfR Fischeln.

He appeared in 196 top-flight matches in East and the reunified Germany.

Weidemann collected ten caps for the East Germany national team between 1985 and 1990.

Honours
Schalke 04
 Bundesliga: third place 1995–96
 UEFA Cup: 1996–97

References

External links
 
 
 

1963 births
Living people
People from Weißensee, Thuringia
People from Bezirk Erfurt
German footballers
East German footballers
Footballers from Thuringia
Association football midfielders
East Germany international footballers
DDR-Oberliga players
Bundesliga players
FC Rot-Weiß Erfurt players
1. FC Lokomotive Leipzig players
1. FC Nürnberg players
SV Waldhof Mannheim players
MSV Duisburg players
FC Schalke 04 players
Hertha BSC players
Fortuna Düsseldorf players
FC Gütersloh 2000 players
UEFA Cup winning players
German football managers
Fortuna Düsseldorf managers
KFC Uerdingen 05 managers